Edwin Hanson Webster "Jigger" Harlan (May 12, 1886 – August 7, 1939) was an American football and baseball player, coach, and attorney.  He played college football at Princeton University and was a consensus first-team selection to the 1907 College Football All-America Team.  Harlan coached the Johns Hopkins University football and baseball teams in 1912.  He served as the head football coach at Texas A&M University from 1915 to 1916.

Biography
Harlan was born in Maryland in 1886.  His father, William H. Harlan, was a judge in Bel Air, Maryland.  Harlan graduated from Episcopal High School in Alexandria, Virginia, in 1904.

Harlan enrolled in Princeton University in 1904.  He played for the Princeton Tigers football and baseball teams. He was captain of the baseball team, and he was selected as a consensus first-team halfback on the 1907 College Football All-America Team.

Harlan graduated from Princeton in 1908 and enrolled at the University of Maryland School of Law, receiving his degree in 1911.  He served as the football and baseball coach at Johns Hopkins University in 1912.  He also practiced law in Harford County, Maryland, serving at various times as the city attorney for Bel Air, Maryland, and as counsel to the Harford County Boards of Education and Elections Supervisors.

Harlan coached football at Princeton and the University of Pittsburgh.  He was appointed as the head football coach at Texas A&M University in 1915.

Harlan died in 1939 at Bel Air, Maryland, after a lengthy illness.

Head coaching record

Football

References

External links
 

1886 births
1939 deaths
American football halfbacks
Johns Hopkins Blue Jays baseball coaches
Johns Hopkins Blue Jays football coaches
Pittsburgh Panthers football coaches
Princeton Tigers baseball players
Princeton Tigers football coaches
Princeton Tigers football players
Texas A&M Aggies football coaches
All-American college football players
Maryland lawyers
University of Maryland Francis King Carey School of Law alumni
Sportspeople from Alexandria, Virginia
Players of American football from Maryland
People from Bel Air, Maryland
20th-century American lawyers
Maryland city attorneys